Josip Eugen Tomić (October 18, 1843 – July 13, 1906) was a Croatian writer.

Tomić was born in Požega. He specialised in writing light-hearted fiction, with which he became very popular. Many of his works dealt with neighbouring Bosnia and Herzegovina. He is known for translating 50 plays to Croatian. He is also known for completing August Šenoa's historical novel Kletva (The Curse) and for writing his own historical novels. He died in Zagreb.

References

Tomić, Josip Eugen 

1843 births
1906 deaths
Croatian writers
Burials at Mirogoj Cemetery